Pink colors are usually light or desaturated shades of reds, roses, and magentas which are created on computer and television screens using the RGB color model and in printing with the CMYK color model. As such, it is an arbitrary classification of color.

Below is a list of some of the common pink colors.

Computer web color pinks

Pink

At right is displayed the web color pink.

Light pink

At right is displayed the web color light pink.  The name of the web color is written as "lightpink" (no space) in HTML for computer display.

Although this color is called "light pink", as can be ascertained by inspecting its hex code, it is actually a slightly deeper, not a lighter, tint of pink than the color pink itself.  A more accurate name for it in terms of traditional color nomenclature would therefore be medium light pink.

Hot pink

At right is displayed the web color hot pink.  The name of the web color is written as "hotpink" (no space) in HTML for computer display. This shade of pink, along with bubblegum pink, was a very popular aesthetic during the 2000s.

Deep pink

At right is displayed the web color deep pink. The name of the web color is written as "deeppink" (no space) in HTML for computer display.

Pastel pink

In Western culture, pastel pink is used to symbolize baby girls just as baby blue is often used to symbolize baby boys.

Other notable pink colors

Champagne pink

Displayed at right is the color champagne pink, a strongly yellow-hued shade of pink.

The source of this color is the "Pantone Textile Paper eXtended (TPX)" color list, color #12-1107 TPX—Champagne Pink.

Pink lace

At right is displayed the color pink lace, a very pale purplish pink.

The color name pink lace for this pale tone of rose pink has been in use since 2001, when it was promulgated as one of the colors on the Xona.com Color List.

This color is suggestive of the color of some women's lingerie.

Piggy pink

The color piggy pink is displayed at right.

The color piggy pink is a representation of the color of a pink pig.

The color piggy pink was formulated by Crayola in 1998.
The color was originally called pig pink, but later the name was changed to "piggy pink".

Pale pink

At right is displayed the color pale pink, a light, desaturated shade of pink.

Baby pink

At right is displayed the color baby pink, a light shade of pink.

The first recorded use of baby pink as a color name in English was in 1928.

In Western culture, baby pink is used to symbolize baby girls just as baby blue is often used to symbolize baby boys (but see also the section Pink in gender in the main article on pink.)

Spanish pink

Spanish pink is the color that is called Rosa (the Spanish word for "pink") in the Guía de coloraciones (Guide to colorations) by Rosa Gallego and 
Juan Carlos Sanz, a color dictionary published in 2005 that is widely popular in the Hispanophone realm.

Cameo pink

At right is displayed the color cameo pink, a medium light tone of rose pink.

The first recorded use of cameo pink as a color name in English was in 1912.

Orchid pink

Displayed at right is the color orchid pink, a pale and soft purplish pink color.

The source of this color is the "Pantone Textile Paper eXtended (TPX)" color list, color #13-2010 TPX—Orchid Pink.

Fairy Tale

Displayed at the right is the color Fairy Tale, a pale and soft purplish pink color resembling typical fairy outfits in fiction. It is similar to orchid pink but slightly paler and more purple-toned.

The source of this color is the "Pantone Textile Cotton eXtended (TCX)" color list, color #13-2802 TCX—Fairy Tale.

Cherry blossom pink

At right is displayed the color cherry blossom pink, a moderately light pink.

The first recorded use of cherry blossom pink as a color name in English was in 1867.

Cherry blossom pink is an important color in Japanese culture.  In the spring, the Japanese people gather to watch the cherry blossoms bloom during the Hanami festival.  This custom has spread to the United States with the institution of the Cherry Blossom Festival in Washington, D.C.

Cherry blossom pink colored shirts are often worn to work on 15 September (a day a few days before the beginning of spring in the Southern Hemisphere) to celebrate "Cherry Blossom Day" in Brisbane, Australia.

Light hot pink

At right is displayed the color light hot pink.

This is the color hot pink light on the Xona.com Color List.

Lavender pink

At right is displayed the color Lavender pink, a moderately light purplish pink.

This pinkish tone of lavender, displayed at right, is the color designated as lavender in the list of Crayola crayon colors.

Cotton candy

The color cotton candy is displayed at right, a light purplish pink.
The color cotton candy was formulated by Crayola in 1998.

Carnation pink

Displayed at right is the color carnation pink.  Carnation pink is a color that resembles the flower color of a carnation plant. The color as displayed here was formulated by Crayola in 1903, and appears in Crayola's boxes of 16, 24, 32, 48, 64 and 96 colors.

The first recorded use of carnation as a color name in English was in 1535.

Baker-Miller pink

Baker-Miller Pink is a tone of pink that was originally created by mixing one gallon of pure white indoor latex paint with one pint of red trim semi-gloss outdoor paint.  It is named for the two U.S. Navy officers who first experimented with its use in 1979 at the Naval Correctional Facility in Seattle, Washington at the behest of researcher Alexander Schauss. The color is also known as Schauss pink, after Alexander Schauss' extensive research into the effects of the color on emotions and hormones, as well as P-618 and Drunk-Tank Pink.

Results of the use of this color to paint the interiors of correctional institutions has been mixed.  Some prisoners have been calmed by the color, but others have been agitated and disturbed by it.

Tickle me pink

The color tickle me pink is displayed at right, a bright shade of pink.

The color tickle me pink was formulated by Crayola in 1993. The name was created by Joslyn Davis when she won a Crayola competition.

Amaranth pink 

The color amaranth pink is displayed at right. This color is a representation of the color of pink amaranth flowers.

The first recorded use of amaranth pink as a color name in English was in 1905.

American pink

At right is displayed the color American pink.

Charm pink

The color charm pink is displayed at right, a medium shade of purplish pink.

The color name charm pink first came into use in 1948.

The source of this color is the Plochere Color System, a color system formulated in 1948 that is widely used by interior designers.

"Charm pink" is a medium roseish tone of pink that is used in interior design.

China pink

The color China pink is displayed at right, a dark purplish pink.

The color name China pink first came into use in 1948.

The source of this color is the Plochere Color System, a color system formulated in 1948 that is widely used by interior designers.

Mimi Pink 

The Color Mimi Pink is displayed at right, a very pale shade of purplish pink.

Misty rose

Misty rose is a pale shade of pink. It is also a web color.

Tango pink

The color tango pink is displayed at right, a moderate reddish pink.

Another name for this color is tango.

The first recorded use of tango pink as a color name in English was in 1925.

The source of this color is the Plochere Color System, a color system formulated in 1948 that is widely used by interior designers.

Congo pink

The color Congo pink is displayed at right, a moderate yellow-toned shade of pink.

The first recorded use of Congo pink as a color name in English was in 1912.

"Congo pink" is an orangeish tone of pink.

The normalized color coordinates for Congo pink are identical to Coral pink, which was first recorded as a color name in English in 1892.

Coral pink

The color coral pink is displayed at right, a pinkish color.

The first recorded use of coral pink as a color name in English was in 1892.

The complementary color of coral pink is teal.

The normalized color coordinates for coral pink are identical to Congo pink, which was first recorded as a color name in English in 1912.

New York pink

At right is displayed the color New York pink, a dark, desaturated yellow-toned shade of pink.

The color name New York pink for this dark tone of pink has been in use since 2001, when it was promulgated as one of the colors on the Xona.com Color List.

Solid pink

At right is displayed the color solid pink, a dark reddish pink.

The color name solid pink for this extremely dark tone of pink has been in use since 2001, when it was promulgated as one of the colors on the Xona.com Color List.

Silver pink

The color silver pink is displayed at right, a grayish shade of pink.

The color name silver pink first came into use in 1948.

The source of this color is the Plochere Color System, a color system formulated in 1948 that is widely used by interior designers.

Queen pink

The color queen pink is displayed at right, a pale shade of pink.

The color name queen pink first came into use in 1948.

The source of this color is the Plochere Color System, a color system formulated in 1948 that is widely used by interior designers.

Pink lavender

The color pink lavender is displayed at right, a light, strongly purplish shade of pink.

The source of this color is the "Pantone Textile Paper eXtended (TPX)" color list, color #14-3207 TPX—Pink Lavender.

Mountbatten pink

Mountbatten pink, also called Plymouth pink, is a naval camouflage color, a grayish tone of mauve, invented by Louis Mountbatten of the British Royal Navy in autumn 1940 during World War II.

Chilean Pink

Chilean pink color is a shade of Chilean pink flower (Lapageria r. specie), resembling light pale red-orange, pale vermilion nuance.

Pale Dogwood

Pale Dogwood is a beige-tinted shade of pink.

The source of this color is the "Pantone Textile Cotton eXtended (TCX)" color list, color #13-1404 TCX—Pale Dogwood.

Pink (Pantone)

Displayed at right is the color called pink in Pantone.

In Pantone, this color is designated as Pink U.

The source of this color is the "Pantone Textile Paper eXtended (TPX)" color list, color #U—Pink.

Mexican pink

Mexican pink is a color that is used in clothing such as serapes and in the craft and fine art of traditional Mexican culture.

Mexican pink became known as such through the efforts of the journalist, painter, cartoonist and fashion designer Ramón Valdiosera in the mid-1940s.

Barbie pink

The color Barbie pink is displayed at right, a deep shade of pink.

Pantone 219C is the color used by Mattel's Barbie in logos, packaging, and promotional materials.

Fandango pink

Displayed at right is the color fandango pink, a vivid pink.

The source of this color is the "Pantone Textile Paper eXtended (TPX)" color list, color #17-2033 TPX—Fandango Pink.

Paradise pink

Displayed at right is the color paradise pink, a bright, reddish pink.

The source of this color is the "Pantone Textile Paper eXtended (TPX)" color list, color #17-1755 TPX—Paradise Pink.

Brink pink

The color brink pink was formulated by Crayola in 1998. Since 2005 it is called pink sherbert.

French pink

At right is displayed the color French pink, which is the tone of pink that is called pink in the Pourpre.com color list, a color list widely popular in France.

Bright pink

Bright pink is a maximally saturated tone of pink that is another name for the color rose.

In most Indo-European languages, the color that in English is called pink is called rosa; therefore, the color that is called rose in English is called bright rosa in most European and Latin American countries (using whatever adjective in a particular language means bright in that language).

Persian pink

The color Persian pink is displayed at right, a bright, purplish pink.

The first recorded use of Persian pink as a color name in English was in 1923.

Rose pink

The color Rose pink is displayed at right, a bright, purplish pink.

The first recorded use of rose pink as a color name in English was in 1761.

Light deep pink

At right is displayed the color light deep pink, a bright purplish pink.

This is the color deep pink light on the Xona.com Color List.

Ultra pink

Ultra pink is a Crayola crayon color formulated in 1972. In 1990, the name was changed in error to shocking pink; however, properly speaking, the name shocking pink should be reserved for only the original shocking pink formulated by Elsa Schiaparelli in 1937 (shown below).

Shocking pink

Shocking pink is bold and intense. It takes its name from the tone of pink used in the lettering on the box of the perfume called Shocking, designed by Leonor Fini for the Surrealist fashion designer Elsa Schiaparelli in 1937. The color shown at right matches the color of the lettering on the original box. This in turn was inspired by the Tête de Belier (Ram's Head), a 17.27 ct pink diamond from Cartier owned by heiress Daisy Fellowes, who was one of Schiaparelli's best clients.

Shocking pink kept its name in British English, whereas in North America "This intense magenta was called shocking pink in the 1930s, hot pink in the 1950s, and kinky pink in the 1960s...[it] has appeared in the vanguard of more than one youth revolution...to some it sings, to others it screams". This color is now again called "shocking pink" to distinguish it from the web color hot pink (shown above).

NHRA drag racer Shirley Muldowney was famous for driving a shocking pink dragster.

On its way into the German language, shocking pink lost the "shocking" and is called only "Pink"; the color that is called "pink" in English is called "rosa" in German as it is in most other Indo-European languages. A similar situation happens in Portuguese, but its nomenclature arrives intact, becoming "rosa-choque" ("shocking pink"). Brazilians also call all darker and hot tones of pink "rosa-pink".

Super pink

Displayed at right is the color super pink, a very purple-toned shade of pink.

The source of this color is the "Pantone Textile Paper eXtended (TPX)" color list, color #17-2625 TPX—Super Pink.

Rose Pompadour

Displayed at right is the color , a desaturated, purplish pink.

This color was designed by Sèvres for Madame de Pompadour, in 18th century France.

Steel pink

The color steel pink is displayed at right, a strongly purple-toned shade of pink.

The color steel pink was introduced by Crayola in January 2011, when the Ultra Hot and Super Cool set of Crayola colored pencils was fully introduced.

"Steel pink" is a deep tone of magenta.

Bubblegum pink

The color Bubblegum pink is displayed at right.

"Bubblegum pink" is a deep tone of magenta. This shade of pink, along with hot pink, were a very popular aesthetic during the 2000s.

Lusty gallant

The color Lusty gallant is displayed at right.

"Lusty gallant" is a light shade of pink that originated in Elizabethan England.

See also
 Lists of colors

References